Theodor Liebisch (29 April 1852, Breslau – 9 February 1922, Berlin) was a German mineralogist and crystallographer.

Biography 
In 1874 he received his doctorate from the University of Breslau, then worked as an assistant to Gerhard vom Rath at the University of Bonn. After several years spent as a curator at the mineralogical museum of the University of Berlin, he became an associate professor of mineralogy at Breslau (1880). Afterwards he successively served as a full professor of mineralogy at the universities of Greifswald (1883/84), Königsberg (from 1884), Göttingen (1887–1909) and Berlin (1909–22). He was an editor of the periodical "Jahrbuch für Mineralogie, Geologie und Paläontologie".

His name is associated with "Liebisch twinning", a complex type of crystal twinning that is a combination of the Dauphiné and Brazil twinning laws.

Principal works 
 Geometrische krystallographie, 1881 – Geometric crystallography.
 Physikalische krystallographie, 1891 – Physical crystallography.
 Grundriss der physikalischen Krystallographie, 1896 – Outline of physical crystallography.
 Die synthese der mineralien und gesteine, 1901 – The synthesis of minerals and rocks.

References 

1852 births
1922 deaths
Academic staff of the University of Breslau
Academic staff of the Humboldt University of Berlin
Academic staff of the University of Greifswald
Academic staff of the University of Göttingen
Academic staff of the University of Königsberg
German mineralogists
Crystallographers